Hermann Schulz (born 14 December 1961) is a German former figure skater who represented East Germany. He is the 1981 national champion and competed at the 1980 Winter Olympics.

Personal life 
Schulz was born on 14 December 1961 in Dresden, Saxony, East Germany. He works as an internist at the center for dialysis in Döbeln.

Skating career 
Schulz learned his first triple jumps at Dresdner Eislauf-Club in Dresden. He was coached by Ingrid Lehmann. As a 13-year-old, he placed 8th at the 1975 European Championships in Copenhagen, Denmark. He won gold at the 1978 Blue Swords.

Schulz represented East Germany at the 1980 Winter Olympics in Lake Placid, New York. He became East Germany's national champion in 1981. At the 1981 European Championships, he was in the lead after the compulsory figures and finished fourth overall. He then retired from figure skating due to injuries.

Schulz has served as an international figure skating judge.

Results

External links 

1961 births
Living people
German male single skaters
Figure skaters at the 1980 Winter Olympics
Olympic figure skaters of East Germany
Sportspeople from Dresden